Dinah Pfizenmaier (born 13 January 1992) is a German former tennis player.

Pfizenmaier won nine singles and two doubles titles on the ITF Circuit in her career. On 17 March 2014, she reached her best singles ranking of world No. 79. On 2 February 2015, she peaked at No. 245 in the doubles rankings.

Professional career

2012
Pfizenmaier made her Grand Slam debut at the 2012 French Open. She qualified for the main draw by defeating Kristýna Plíšková, Misaki Doi and Monica Puig. In the first round of the main draw, she defeated local talent Caroline Garcia to set up a clash with world No. 1, Victoria Azarenka. She lost the meeting in straight sets.

2013
Pfizenmaier qualified again for the 2013 French Open, defeating Chiara Scholl, Irina Khromacheva and Vera Dushevina. In the main draw she defeated Mandy Minella and rising star Urszula Radwańska. In round 3, she was defeated by fourth seed Agnieszka Radwańska.

2014
At the French Open in 2014, Pfizenmaier defeated Estrella Cabeza Candela in the first round, but lost to Sara Errani in round two.

ITF finals

Singles: 13 (9–4)

Doubles: 5 (2–3)

Singles performance timeline

*: only WTA Tour main-draw matches

References

External links

 
 

1992 births
Living people
Sportspeople from Bielefeld
German female tennis players
Tennis people from North Rhine-Westphalia